The College Hockey Association (CHA) is a collegiate club ice hockey league that comprises smaller colleges and universities and community colleges in Western Pennsylvania and Western New York. Every player in the CHA maintains the academic standards of at least the ACHA D-III level. However, membership into the ACHA is optional for CHA members. The league is operated and run by College Hockey East, and is most commonly known as the third tier of the Open League.

CHA Champions
2010-11: St. John Fisher College
2009-10: Canisius College
2008-09: Canisius College
 2007-08: Hilbert College
 2006-07: Hilbert College
 2005-06: Youngstown State University
 2004-05: CCAC-North

Teams

North Division
D'youville College 
Gannon University
Fredonia State University (Team 2)
Medaille College
Penn State Behrend (Team 2)

South Division
Carnegie Mellon University (Team 2)
University of Pittsburgh at Greensburg
California University of PA (Team 2) 
Case Western Reserve University

Former Teams

St. John Fisher College
Canisius College
Allegheny College
Hilbert College
Youngstown State University

External links
CHA site

See also
American Collegiate Hockey Association
List of ice hockey leagues

ACHA Division 3 conferences